Tumba (Greek: Τούμπα, Bulgarian and Macedonian: Тумба) is a peak in the Belasica mountains in the region of Macedonia. The peak,  in height, lies on Belasica's main ridge, west of Lozen Peak and east of Sechena Skala Peak. A dome-shaped mountain with steep southern and northern slopes, Tumba is covered with low subalpine vegetation and is made of metamorphic rock. Tumba is notable as the point where the national borders of Bulgaria, Greece and North Macedonia meet (tripoint). It is one of the southwesternmost point of Bulgaria and one of the southeasternmost point of North Macedonia.

In Bulgaria, favourable starting points of an ascent are the villages Klyuch, Skrat and Gabrene. In North Macedonia, these are Smolari and Sharena Cheshma. In Greece these are Platanakia, Kalochori and Kastanoussa. Every August since 2001, an international excursion to the peak is organized under the motto "Balkans Without Borders".

References

External links
 Travel notes of a Tumba ascent by Yoana Yancheva 

Mountains of Greece
Mountains of North Macedonia
Mountains of Bulgaria
Landforms of Blagoevgrad Province
Geography of Macedonia (region)
Bulgaria–North Macedonia border
Greece–North Macedonia border
Bulgaria–Greece border
International mountains of Europe
Border tripoints
One-thousanders of Europe